Several warships of the German Kaiserliche Marine (Imperial Navy) have been named SMS Wolf:

 , a gunboat of the 
 , a gunboat of the 
 , an auxiliary cruiser
 , an auxiliary cruiser

German Navy ship names